This is a list of episodes for the first season of Lou Grant.

Episodes

Ratings
The show ranked 41st out of 104 shows airing during the 1977-78 season, with an average 18.7 rating.

References

1977 American television seasons
1978 American television seasons
Lou Grant (TV series) seasons